Chilulumo is an administrative ward in Mbozi District, Songwe Region, Tanzania. According to 2002 census results, the ward has a total population of 13,388.

References

Wards of Songwe Region